All These Countless Nights is the fourth studio album from English band Deaf Havana. It was released on 27 January 2017 through So Recordings. The album was rereleased along with the "reworked" versions of the album's tracks and one bonus track on 27 October 2017.

Releases
The first single was "Sing". It received its debut radio play on 10 July 2016 on the BBC Radio 1 Rock Show. It was released on 11 July 2016.

The second single was "Trigger", which was released on 14 October 2016.

Track listing

Bonus tracks

All These Countless Nights (Reworked)

Chart performance
The album debuted on the UK Albums Chart at number 5, and topped the UK Independent Albums Chart.

References

Deaf Havana albums
2017 albums